Moby Grape '69 is the third album by the psychedelic rock band Moby Grape, released on January 30, 1969.

It is the first album after the departure of co-founder Skip Spence. Spence nonetheless is heard on one song, "Seeing", presumably from the Wow/Grape Jam sessions, and positioned as the final song on Moby Grape '69. As Peter Lewis describes the album, "We made Moby Grape '69, in an attempt to rebound from the Wow album, which was over-produced. And it's a cool album. Although we could have rehearsed it a little more, we still believed in it. But I think we were waiting for Skippy to come back, and he never did."

The album peaked at a disappointing number 113 on the Billboard chart. While it did not sell well at the time of its release, in a recent (2008) review, it is pointed out that the album would be particularly appreciated by people who like the music of Poco and The Eagles. For Moby Grape fans at the time, the album was perhaps too country in musical orientation. In some respects, the album was ahead of its time, predating the more popular first country rock releases by Poco and The Eagles.

The album was re-released on CD and Vinyl in 2007 by Sundazed, but as with their previous albums, it has been pulled.

Track listing

Side one 
 "Ooh Mama Ooh" (Jerry Miller, Don Stevenson) – 2:26
 "Ain't That a Shame" (Jerry Miller, Don Stevenson, Peter Lewis) – 2:28
 "I Am Not Willing" (Peter Lewis) – 2:58
 "It's a Beautiful Day Today" (Bob Mosley) – 3:06
 "Hoochie" (Bob Mosley) – 4:21

Side two 
 "Trucking Man" (Bob Mosley) – 2:00
 "If You Can't Learn from My Mistakes" (Peter Lewis) – 2:33
 "Captain Nemo" (Jerry Miller, Don Stevenson) – 1:43
 "What's to Choose" (Peter Lewis) – 1:57
 "Going Nowhere" (Jerry Miller, Don Stevenson) – 2:01
 "Seeing" (Skip Spence) – 3:44

Bonus tracks on 2007 CD edition 
 "Soul Stew" (Bob Mosley) – 2:16
 "If You Can't Learn from My Mistakes" [Demo] (Peter Lewis) – 1:23
 "You Can Do Anything" [Demo] (Skip Spence) – 3:35
 "It's a Beautiful Day Today" [Demo] (Bob Mosley) – 4:12
 Previously unreleased
 "What's to Choose" [Demo] (Peter Lewis) – 3:19
 Previously unreleased
 "Big" [Demo] (Jerry Miller, Don Stevenson) – 2:19
 "Hoochie" [Demo] (Bob Mosley) – 3:18
 Previously unreleased

Personnel 
 Peter Lewis - rhythm guitar, vocals
 Jerry Miller - lead guitar, vocals
 Bob Mosley - bass, vocals
 Don Stevenson - drums, vocals
 Skip Spence - vocals and unknown instruments (on "Seeing")

Charts 
Album - Billboard

References 

Moby Grape albums
1969 albums
Albums produced by Dave Rubinson
Columbia Records albums